State Highway 183 (SH 183) is a state highway in the Dallas–Fort Worth metroplex in Texas.  Its most heavily used section is designated Airport Freeway where it serves the southern entrance of Dallas–Fort Worth International Airport.

History
SH 183 was designated on November 30, 1932 from SH 15 east of Mesquite via Mesquite to Dallas. This highway was SH 15A before March 19, 1930, and this highway was erroneously omitted from the March 19, 1930 highway log. On September 26, 1939, it extended to Fort Worth, replacing a section of SH 15. On October 30, 1939, SH 183 was extended west from US 81 to US 80. On October 6, 1943, SH 183 was extended south from US 80 to US 377, and SH 183 was rerouted east to US 77 northwest of Dallas. The section east of US 77 was renumbered as SH 352, and the old route west of US 77 would be designated as FM 684 on February 26, 1946, but this would be changed to SH 356 on August 8, 1946. On December 4, 1957, SH 183 was rerouted to end at I 35-E, and the old route of SH 183 was transferred to Loop 12. On May 13, 1977, SH 183 was extended southeast to I-20 over cancelled Loop 820. On August 29, 1979, SH 183 was rerouted over Spur 350 and SH 121 and I-820. The old route of SH 183 was redesignated as SH 10.

Route description

Its eastern terminus is the interchange with Interstate 35E in Dallas.  It leads northwest as the John W. Carpenter Freeway, then moves westward at the three-way interchange with State Highway 114 and Loop 12 at the former site of Texas Stadium (from which Highway 114 continues as the Carpenter Freeway).  The freeway continues as Airport Freeway on its westerly course through Irving, and forms the southern boundary of DFW Airport.

Moving into Tarrant County, the freeway, still called Airport Freeway, continues west through Euless, Bedford, and Hurst.  In Bedford, 183 joins State Highway 121 and both follow the same co-signed westerly route.  At the intersection with Interstate 820, 183 and 121 turn south with the interstate, and all three highways briefly share the same co-signed route.

After entering Haltom City, 183 joins State Highway 26 and, briefly, U.S. Highway 377, leading southwest through Haltom City as East Belknap Street. At an intersection with Northeast 28th Street and Midway Road, 183 turns west onto the former. After entering the Fort Worth city limits, 183 intersects Interstate 35W/US 287 in a parclo interchange, then passes the historic Fort Worth Stock Yards.

In western Fort Worth and its environs, Highway 183 forms a partial ring road. In northwest Fort Worth, this semicircular route begins when 183 curves southwest as Ephriham Avenue. Continuing southwest, 183 becomes River Oaks Boulevard in River Oaks, Westworth Boulevard in Westworth Village, and Alta Mere Drive as it passes the eastern boundaries of Fort Worth Naval Air Base and White Settlement.  Turning south past Ridgmar Mall and a cloverleaf interchange with Interstate 30, 183 crosses Spur 580 (formerly U.S. Highway 80, part of the Bankhead Highway) and again meets U.S. Highway 377 at a rotary intersection, referred to locally as a traffic circle. From the circle, it turns southeast as Southwest Boulevard, again becoming a freeway and passing through Benbrook before reaching its southern terminus at Interstate 20 and Southwest Loop 820 near Hulen Mall.  This freeway segment served as the alignment of Interstates 20 and 820 before the current route was completed in the early 1980s.

Exit list
The entire route is located inside Tarrant and Dallas counties.

References

Bibliography 
Fort Worth Street Map. Chicago: Rand McNally, 1990. 
"Dallas/Ft. Worth & Vicinity." Texas Atlas & Gazetteer. First edition. Freeport, Maine: DeLorme Mapping, 1995. 
"Dallas/Ft. Worth & Vicinity." The Road Atlas: United States, Canada & Mexico. Skokie, Illinois: Rand McNally, 2001. 

183
Transportation in Tarrant County, Texas
Transportation in Dallas County, Texas